Clypeaster aloysioi is a species of sea urchins of the Family Clypeasteridae. Their armour is covered with spines. C. aloysioi was first scientifically described in 1959 by Brito.

See also 

 Cidaris rugosa
 Cionobrissus revinctus
 Clypeaster amplificatus

References 

Animals described in 1959
Clypeaster
Taxa named by Alberto Brito